The African Journal of Paediatric Surgery is a peer-reviewed medical journal publishing articles related to clinical or laboratory-based research in paediatric surgery.

Indexing and abstracting information 
The journal is indexed in Abstracts on Hygiene and Communicable Diseases, African Index Medicus, CAB Abstracts, EBSCO Databases, MEDLINE, and Index Medicus.

References

External links 
 Online access at African Journals OnLine

Publications established in 2004
Pediatrics journals
Surgery journals
Medknow Publications academic journals